The 2021–22 Colgate Raiders Men's ice hockey season was the 92nd season of play for the program and the 61st season in the ECAC Hockey conference. The Raiders represented the Colgate University and played their home games at Class of 1965 Arena, and were coached by Don Vaughan, in his 29th season as their head coach.

Season
Colgate got off to a hot start, winning its first four games and nearly entering the top-20. The Raiders played a pivotal game against Western Michigan at the end of October and looked to be heading for a surprise win when the jumped out to a 5–0 lead. In the second half of the game, however, the Broncos completely took over the game and scored six unanswered goals to take the match. That loss kicked off a downward stretch for the team that saw them go 3–12–2 over a three month period. Other than a pair of shutouts in November, there was very little that went right for the Raiders. The team's offense was inconsistent, their goaltending was suspect and they sank towards the bottom of the conference standings.

After Carter Gylander lost his starting role in early January, both backups received time in goal but nothing seemed to work. Finally, at the end of the month, Mitch Benson put together a string of good games and allowed the team to get back on its feet. Over the final month of the season, Colgate started winning again and charged up the standings. The Raiders propelled themselves into a mediocre record, good enough for 5th in the ECAC. While they still had to play in the First Round of the conference tournament, they did so against the weakest opponent.

Colgate got a small scare in the first game when Yale tied the match in the last minute of regulation to force overtime. After escaping with a win, the Raiders were much better in the second game and swept the series. In the quarterfinals, Benson was assailed by the Cornell offense, facing 43 shots in the first match. After the loss, the team had no room for error and responded with a strong performance in game 2, tying the series with an offensive outburst. The final meeting looked more like the first, with the Big Red firing shot after shot on goal but Benson was equal to the task. He held Cornell scoreless for over 59 minutes, allowing the Riders to build a 2–0 lead, but lost his shutout bid with just 8 seconds to play. The result was what Colgate needed however, and the team advanced to the semifinals.

Because of the poor middle to their season, Colgate had no chance to make the NCAA tournament without winning the conference championship. To do that they would first have to get past Quinnipiac, who had been ranked #1 earlier in the season. The top seed didn't take pity on the Raiders and got out to a 2 goal lead in the first period. Colgate upped their game in the second, cutting the Bobcats' advantage in half, but the Raider offense couldn't net a tying goal. A third goal midway through the third put Quinnipiac back up by 2 Colgate's tournament hopes were dashed shortly afterwards.

Departures

Recruiting

Roster
As of August 19, 2021.

Standings

Schedule and results

|-
!colspan=12 style=";" | Regular Season

|-
!colspan=12 style=";" | 

|- align="center" bgcolor="#e0e0e0"
|colspan=12|Colgate Won Series 2–0

|- align="center" bgcolor="#e0e0e0"
|colspan=12|Colgate Won Series 2–1

Scoring statistics

Goaltending statistics

Rankings

Note: USCHO did not release a poll in week 24.

Players drafted into the NHL

2022 NHL Entry Draft

† incoming freshman

References

2021-22
Colgate Raiders
Colgate Raiders
Colgate Raiders
Colgate Raiders